The Long'ao Building (龙奥大厦; also spelt as Long Ao or Longao) is a massively large building in Lixia District, Jinan, Shandong Province, China. The building, completed in 2007, serves as the municipal office building for the city of Jinan.

Besides government offices, the Long'ao Building houses public conference rooms, exhibition halls, air defense shelters, archives, medical facilities, and so forth.

The Long'ao Building cost about 4 billion yuan (equivalent to about 640 million American dollars) to construct.

The Long'ao Building was first used as the control and news center for the 11th National Games of China which were held in Jinan in 2009, after which the building was given over to its current use.

Criticism
This relative capaciousness, along with other alleged extravagances, the 4 billion yuan cost, and a perceived lack of transparency in the process of creating the building, has drawn some criticism.

Transport
It is served by Longao Building station on Jinan Metro Line 3.

References

City and town halls in China
Buildings and structures in Jinan
2007 establishments in China